Neerach is a municipality in the district of Dielsdorf in the canton of Zürich in Switzerland.

History
Neerach is first mentioned between 1160 and 1169 as Neracho.  In 1149, Ried was mentioned as Riete.

Geography

Of this area, 64.2% is used for agricultural purposes, while 5.7% is forested. Of the rest of the land, 17.7% is settled (buildings or roads) and the remainder (12.5%) is non-productive (rivers, glaciers or mountains).

The municipality is composed of the two villages of Neerach and Ried.

Demographics
, 9.4% of the population was made up of foreign nationals. Over the last 10 years the population has grown at a rate of 30.2%. Most of the population speaks German  (92.9%), with French being second most common (1.6%) and English being third (1.6%).

In the 2007 election, the most popular party was the SVP which received 51.5% of the vote.  The next three most popular parties were the FDP (13.1%), the SPS (9.6%) and the CSP (9.4%).

The age distribution of the population is as follows: children and teenagers (0–19 years old) make up 21% of the population, while adults (20–64 years old) make up 70% and seniors (over 64 years old) make up 9%.  In Neerach about 86.7% of the population (between age 25-64) have completed either non-mandatory upper secondary education or additional higher education (either university or a Fachhochschule).

Neerach has an unemployment rate of 1.34%.  , there were 63 people employed in the primary economic sector and about 23 businesses involved in this sector.  111 people are employed in the secondary sector and there are 29 businesses in this sector.  310 people are employed in the tertiary sector, with 112 businesses in this sector.

The historical population is given in the following table:

References

External links 

 Official website 

Municipalities of the canton of Zürich